Ronald John Boehm (August 14, 1943 – December 8, 2017) was a Canadian professional ice hockey winger. His playing career, which lasted from 1964 to 1975, was mainly spent in various minor leagues, though he also played 16 games in the National Hockey League for the Oakland Seals during the 1967–68 season. He died on December 8, 2017.

Career statistics

Regular season and playoffs

References

External links
 

1943 births
2017 deaths
Boston Braves (AHL) players
Broome Dusters players
Canadian ice hockey left wingers
Estevan Bruins (SJHL) players
Ice hockey people from Saskatchewan
Minneapolis Bruins players
Minnesota Rangers players
Oakland Seals players
Omaha Knights (CHL) players
Sportspeople from Saskatoon
Seattle Totems (WHL) players
Vancouver Canucks (WHL) players